Centuries is an EP by Mentallo & The Fixer, released on February 25, 1997, by Metropolis Records.

Reception
Last Sigh Magazine was somewhat positive in their review of Centuries and pointed to the tracks "Stellar Cascade" (Spore-Print) and "Other World Technology" (Re-Mix) as being its strongest moments. Sonic Boom commended the band for diversifying their style, saying "'Other World Technologies', is the most club friendly Mentallo song to date" and "'Lightyear' & 'Stellar Cascade' seem to lack much of the signature Mentallo keyboard sound as well."

Track listing

Personnel
Adapted from the Centuries liner notes.

Mentallo & The Fixer
 Dwayne Dassing (as The Fixer) – programming and engineering (1-3, 5, 6), mixing (1-3, 4, 5), producer (2, 3, 5, 6), remixer (4)
 Gary Dassing (as Mentallo) – programming, producer (1, 2, 3, 4), editing (1-3), mixing (1, 2), remixer (4)

Production and design
 Brett Caraway – mastering
 Dane Rougeau – cover art, design

Release history

References

External links 
 

1997 EPs
Mentallo & The Fixer albums
Metropolis Records EPs
Off Beat (label) EPs